Blue China can refer to:
Republic of China (1912–1949), as of 1928
Republic of China, commonly known as "Taiwan" after 1949
Nationalist government
Kuomintang